Zisis Babanasis (born 3 August 1964) is a Greek fencer. He competed in the individual sabre events at the 1984 and 1992 Summer Olympics.

References

External links
 

1964 births
Living people
Greek male fencers
Olympic fencers of Greece
Fencers at the 1984 Summer Olympics
Fencers at the 1992 Summer Olympics
Fencers from Budapest
Hungarian expatriates in Greece